The 2013 Women's South American Volleyball Club Championship was the fifth official edition of the women's volleyball tournament, played by five teams from 1 – 5 May 2013 in Miraflores, Lima, Peru. Unilever qualified to the 2013 FIVB Women's Club World Championship.

Competing clubs

Round robin
The competition system for the tournament was a single round robin system. Each team plays once against each of the four remaining teams. Points are accumulated during the whole tournament, and the final ranking is determined by the total points gained.

Results

|}

|}

Final standing

Team Roster:
Gabi,
Mara,	
Bruna,	
Regis,
Juciely,	
Fofão(C),
Roberta,
Valeskinha,	
Natalia,	
Fabi(L),		
Luciane,		
Juju

Head Coach: Bernardinho

Individual awards
MVP:  Natália Pereira (Unilever)
Best Spiker:  Gabriela Guimarães (Unilever)
Best Blocker:  Bruna Silva (Unilever)
Best Server:  Milagros Moy (U. César Vallejo)
Best Setter:  Hélia Souza (Unilever)
Best Digger:  Fabiana de Oliveira (Unilever)
Best Receiver:  Mirian Patiño (U. César Vallejo)
Best Libero:  Fabiana de Oliveira (Unilever)

References

Women's South American Volleyball Club Championship
Women's South American Volleyball Club Championship
Women's South American Volleyball Club Championship
International volleyball competitions hosted by Peru